Eagle Lake is an unincorporated community and census-designated place (CDP) in Will County, Illinois, United States. It is near the southeast corner of the county, in the northeast corner of Washington Township.

Eagle Lake was first listed as a CDP prior to the 2020 census.

Demographics

References 

Census-designated places in Will County, Illinois
Census-designated places in Illinois
Unincorporated communities in Will County, Illinois
Unincorporated communities in Illinois